The Tobago House of Assembly (THA) is a unicameral devolved legislative body responsible for the island of Tobago within the unitary state of Trinidad and Tobago. The THA was re-established in 1980 to rectify some of the disparities in the relationship between the two islands, though a prior body using the same name existed from 1768 to 1874.  In addition to the normal local government functions the THA handles many of the responsibilities of the central government, but has limited ability to collect taxes and impose local law  or zoning regulations.  At the helm of the Assembly Legislature is the Presiding Officer with the fifteen elected assemblymen, and four appointed councillors. Three of the councillors are appointed on the advice on the Chief Secretary and one on the advice of the Minority Leader. The Chief Secretary is the leader of the majority party in the assembly and is at the helm of the Executive arm of the THA.

The current Chief Secretary of Tobago is Farley Chavez Augustine who is the second youngest Chief Secretary in history, in office since December 6, 2021. He was elected as a member of the PDP but left the party to become an independent in 2022.

History
The first THA elections were held on November 24, 1980.  The Democratic Action Congress led by A.N.R. Robinson won eight seats and the People's National Movement (PNM) won four seats (a reversal of the 1977 County Council elections in which the PNM won seven seats and the DAC 4).  The DAC went on to win the 1984 elections by a margin of 11–1 over the PNM.  The National Alliance for Reconstruction (into which the DAC merged in 1986) continued to dominate the THA winning the 1988 elections, and the 1992 elections by an 11-1 margin over the PNM. It won the 1996 elections by a margin of 10–2, with the PNM and an independent candidate winning one seat each.

In the 2001 elections the PNM gained control of the THA, winning 8 seats to the NAR's four.  The PNM consolidated their hold on the THA in the January 2005 elections winning 11 seats while the DAC (which reformed after splintering from the NAR in 2004) gained a single seat.

In the 2009 elections held on January 19, 2009, the PNM won 8 seats while a new party, the Tobago Organization of the People won 4 seats.

In the 2013 elections, the TOP was defeated in a landslide by the PNM, losing the 4 seats it held previously, giving the PNM complete control of the THA. However, Chief Secretary Orville London asked Prime Minister Kamla Persad-Bissessar to introduce a bill in the country's parliament that would change the country's constitution to allow the President of the Republic to choose two independent councillors at his/her discretion to serve as opposition in the THA in the event of a 12-0 election result.

As of 2021, the THA employed about 60% of Tobago's working population.

In December 2022, 13 members of the PDP left the party to govern as independents.

Current Assembly Members

Party Divisions by Assembly

See also 

Chief Secretary of Tobago
List of Presiding Officers of the Tobago House of Assembly
Local government in Trinidad and Tobago
Politics of Trinidad and Tobago

References

External links
 

Government of Trinidad and Tobago
Tobago
Legislatures of country subdivisions
Tobago